The Łódź Niciarniana  is a name assigned to a commuter railway station in the city of Łódź, Poland, located in Widzew district, approximately  away from Łódź Fabryczna station. The station bears its name after the Niciarniana street, which runs closely to the station.

The station was opened during inter-war period of the 1920s and 1930s as a station for local thread factory workers, it also served a branch line leading to the factory. The current name of the station was given in 1951. From 1951 to 2011 the station was used mainly for regional and commuter services, as well as special trains with football fans arriving for games played on the stadium of Widzew Łódź football club.

On 16 October 2011, the station was closed, and demolished one year later. During the major reconstruction of the railway line between Fabryczna and Widzew stations, the station was rebuilt from scratch, this time in the form of a single island platform located on top of the railway viaduct. The street, which ran next to the station and had a secured crossing before the reconstruction, was routed under the new viaduct.

The new station was opened on 11 December 2016.

Train services
The station is served by the following services:

 InterRegio services (IR) Łódź Fabryczna — Warszawa Glowna 
 InterRegio services (IR) Łódź Kaliska — Warszawa Glowna 
Regional services (PR) Łódź Fabryczna — Częstochowa

References 

Railway stations in Poland opened in 2016
Niciarniana
Railway stations served by Przewozy Regionalne InterRegio
Railway stations served by Łódzka Kolej Aglomeracyjna